Masaki may refer to:

Name
 Masaki (given name), a unisex Japanese given name
 Masaki (surname), a Japanese surname

Places
 Masaki, Ehime, a town located in Iyo District, Japan
 Masaki Art Museum, a museum in Tadaoka, Osaka Prefecture, Japan that opened in 1968
 Masaki Station (disambiguation)
 Masaki, a suburb in Dar es Salaam, Tanzania